Ariadna Sintes (born October 7, 1986, in Havana) is a Cuban-Spanish actress.

Born in Cuba, she moved to San Sebastián in 2000 and she studied at the School of Cinema and Video in Andoain and drama in San Sebastián.

Television 

 Bi eta Bat (2012)
 Maras (2011)
 HKM (2008–2009)
 Mi querido Klikowsky (2007)
 Desde Ahora (1990)

References and external links
 
 FormulaTV.com

1986 births
Living people
Spanish television actresses
Cuban television actresses
People from Havana
Cuban emigrants to Spain